Culex (Eumelanomyia) pluvialis is a species of mosquito belonging to the genus Culex. It is found in India, Malaysia and Sri Lanka.

References

External links 
New species of Culex (Eumelanomyia) from India with descriptions of pupae and larvae of Culex pluvialis Barraud and Culex iphis Barraud (Diptera: Culicidae)
Collected in Egypt

pluvialis
Insects described in 1924